The M2 cycleway is a predominantly on road  cycleway generally aligned with the M2 motorway in the Hills District of Sydney, New South Wales, Australia. As the M2 does not have a separate cycle lane or path, the cycleway comprises the breakdown lane of the roadway.

Route

Cycling access was removed in 2010 during construction work to upgrade the M2. During that time, cyclists were required to use an alternate route on suburban streets that was  longer, steeper and slower. The design of the alternative route was criticised due to safety concerns. In August 2013 access was restored westbound from Delhi Road to Windsor Road. Citybound access was restored only for the section from Windsor Road to Pennant Hills Road due to work to stabilise the embankment near the eastbound lanes at Marsfield. There is an alternate route citybound.

As a result of the construction of the NorthConnex cycleway access to the M2 both east and westbound between Pennant Hills Road and Windsor Road was removed with effect from February 2012 adding a further  via a detour route; with work expected to be completed by 2020.

The M2 cycleway connects to the M7 cycleway at Seven Hills at its north-western terminus and to the Gore Hill and Epping Road cycleways at North Ryde at its eastern terminus.

See also
Bike paths in Sydney
Cycling in New South Wales
Cycling in Sydney

References

External links
Bicycle NSW website

Cycleways in Australia
Cycling in Sydney
Macquarie University